The Córas Iompair Éireann 101 Class locomotives, numbered B101-B112, were built in 1956 by the Birmingham Railway Carriage and Wagon Company.

With their design, size and axle loading, they were intended for mixed traffic duties, hauling both freight and passenger trains. They found regular use primarily on the Waterford-Mallow-Tralee line and also on the Tralee-Newcastle West-Limerick line. Given that they were the first main group of diesel locos used in Ireland, they proved very successful and quickly gained a reputation for comfort and reliability by contrast to the poor cab conditions and suspension rocking of the 113 Class and the interminable breakdowns of the A Class and C Class locomotives.  However, during the 1960s many of the secondary lines that they were used on were closed and following the arrival of the 181 Class, the 101s were relegated to goods, permanent way and pilot duties.

The first withdrawal took place in 1969 (B111), and the last in February 1978 (B106). A proposal to re-engine them in the light of similar refurbishments of the Class 001 and Class 201 came to nothing, and the decision was taken to order new locomotives in the form of the 071 Class instead.

After withdrawal, the entire class was lined up together with the two 113 Class locomotives to form a sound barrier around Inchicore Works. Official withdrawal of the class came in April 1984, and the majority were scrapped between December 1986 and March 1987.

Preservation
One locomotive, No. 103 survived and has been preserved by the Irish Traction Group, and is currently in storage at Carrick-on-Suir railway station. It was purchased by the group in 1993 directly from Iarnród Éireann and is awaiting eventual restoration.

Model 
A resin OO gauge model kit is available from  Studio Scale Models, with etched brass/whitemetal detailing and a selection of decals to cover various liveries.

See also
British Rail Class 24 (fitted with the same engine)

References

External links

 Eiretrains - Irish Locomotives
Irish Traction Group webpage for preserved 103
Sulzer engines from around the world
CIE Derby Sulzers
Other Derby Sulzers

Iarnród Éireann locomotives
BRCW locomotives
A1A-A1A locomotives
5 ft 3 in gauge locomotives
Railway locomotives introduced in 1956
Diesel-electric locomotives of Ireland